Glen Elk Historic District is a national historic district located at Clarksburg, Harrison County, West Virginia.  The district encompasses 131 contributing buildings north of the central business district of Clarksburg. The area was developed after 1898, and contains a mixture of residential and commercial buildings.  They include commercial warehouses built of brick and stone, small commercial buildings, housing specialty shops and eateries, and frame dwellings. Located in the district is the Baltimore and Ohio Railroad Depot (1903).

It was listed on the National Register of Historic Places in 1993.

References

National Register of Historic Places in Harrison County, West Virginia
Historic districts in Harrison County, West Virginia
Houses on the National Register of Historic Places in West Virginia
Commercial buildings on the National Register of Historic Places in West Virginia
Italianate architecture in West Virginia
Queen Anne architecture in West Virginia
Houses in Harrison County, West Virginia
Buildings designated early commercial in the National Register of Historic Places in West Virginia
Historic districts on the National Register of Historic Places in West Virginia
Buildings and structures in Clarksburg, West Virginia